Oslo dialect ( and Østkantmål, translated Vika dialect and East End dialect) is a Norwegian dialect and the traditional dialect of Oslo, Norway. It must not be confused with the current native spoken language of Oslo, Standard East Norwegian. The Oslo dialect has been considered to be an extinct form of Norwegian, but there are surviving fragments of it, especially on the East End of Oslo.

Originally, the Oslo dialect was the dialect of the lower social stratas, primarily the workers, farmers and peasants. The dialect is related to nearby East Norwegian dialects. After the industrialization of Oslo (Christiania/Kristiania) at the end of the 19th century, the Oslo dialect was almost exclusively associated with workers and the east end. As a contrast, the upper and middle classes would speak a language more akin to Dano-Norwegian. In the post-war period, much of the industry near the city centre was demolished. This contributed to the decline of the Oslo dialect.

History
The Oslo dialect has since the late 19th century been strongly associated with the East End of Oslo and other working-class areas of the city, but has seen a decline since the post-war period. It existed side-by-side with Dano-Norwegian, the latter being more associated with the upper and middle classes. Workers moving up the social ladder would adopt Dano-Norwegian. Since the end of the 20th century, the Oslo dialect has been in decline due to higher education levels, growth of media, and larger social mobility. This has caused the Oslo dialect to be considered a low-standard language, which is occasionally looked down upon in modern times.

Since the 1970s, the Oslo dialect (in its original form) has practically been considered extinct, although natives of Oslo can show typical influence of the Oslo dialect during informal and casual speech.

Perhaps the most known examples of Oslo dialect in Norwegian are the Olsenbanden movies, set in Norway from the 1950s to the 1970s. The main characters of Benny, Egon and Kjell speak a dialect close to the original Oslo dialect. In recent times, the dialect has been parodied many times, most notably by Harald Eia's character Oslolosen.

Examples of Oslo dialect
Standard Eastern Norwegian dialect in brackets, along with English translation in italics.

 Bjønn (bjørn, bear)
 Bleik (blek, pale)
 Brei (bred, wide)
 Bærj (berg, mountain)
 Bånn (bunn, bottom)
 Brølløp (bryllup, wedding)
 GåL (gård, farm)
 Hævv (haug, hill)
 Hønn (horn, horn)
 Kløppe (klippe, cliff)
 Kjærke (kirke, church)

See also
 East End and West End of Oslo
 Urban East Norwegian
 Norwegian dialects
 Cockney

Literature
Skjekkeland, Martin, Dei norske dialektane : tradisjonelle særdrag i jamføring med skriftmåla, Kristiansand, Høyskoleforlaget, 1997
Skjekkeland, Martin, Målføre og skriftmål, Oslo, Universitetsforlaget, 1977
Austlandsmål i endring : dialektar, nynorsk og språkhaldningar på indre Austlandet, Oslo, Samlaget, 1999

References

External links
 Nyttige fakta om nyttige ord

Norwegian dialects
Oslo society
Culture in Oslo
City colloquials